The 2001 Christchurch mayoral election was part of the 2001 New Zealand local elections. Incumbent Garry Moore beat talk back radio and television host George Balani.

Background
On 13 October of that year, elections were held for the Mayor of Christchurch plus other local government roles. Despite predictions for a close race, incumbent Moore successfully contested a second term in office with a decisive majority. The second-placed candidate, Balani, was 17,000 votes (15%) behind Moore. Two former Christchurch City Councillors, Gordon Freeman and Robin Booth, came third and fourth.

Moore's main challenger, Balani, had a high profile as a talk back radio and television host; for many years, Balani had a show on Canterbury Television (CTV). A total of 14 candidates contested the 2001 mayoralty in Christchurch. Freeman was a city councillor for 15 years until he stood for mayor only in the 1998 mayoralty. Booth went into the election as a sitting member of Christchurch City Council.

Results

 
 
 
 
 
 
 
 
 
 
 
 
 
 

Moore, Balani and Freeman stood for mayor only. Robin Booth also stood for city councillor in the two-representative Shirley Ward, but came third and was thus defeated. Aaron Keown, who came fifth in the election, was later a Christchurch City Councillor from 2010 for one three-year term. Moore remained mayor until the 2007 election, when he decided not to stand again.

References

Mayoral elections in Christchurch
2001 elections in New Zealand
Politics of Christchurch
October 2001 events in New Zealand
2000s in Christchurch